Wanz is American R&B, soul, hip hop and pop (real name (Michael Wansley).

Wanz may also refer to:

WANZ, American radio station in Stamford, NY, USA
Otto Wanz (1943–2017), Austrian former professional wrestler and boxer
Wanz Factory, Japanese adult video production company

See also
Wanze, Walloon municipality of Belgium located in the province of Liège